Brahmapur  is a village development committee in Saptari District in the Sagarmatha Zone of southeastern Nepal. At the time of the 2011 Nepal census it had a population of 4673 people living in 886 individual households.

References

Populated places in Saptari District
VDCs in Saptari District